Store Brækmoholmen is the largest island in Brækmoholmane, part of Thousand Islands, an island group south of Edgeøya. The island is named after Sivert Brækmo (1853-1930), a Norwegian sailor and fishermen who regularly visited Svalbard between 1876 and 1895.

References

 Norwegian Polar Institute Place Names of Svalbard Database

Islands of Svalbard